Bradley Swaile is a Canadian voice actor. His major roles include Light Yagami in Death Note, Rock in Black Lagoon, and Nightcrawler in X-Men: Evolution. In the 1990s, he voiced  Mousse in Ranma ½ and Teen Gohan in the Ocean dub of Dragon Ball Z. He has also voiced multiple roles in the Mobile Suit Gundam series, including Amuro Ray of Mobile Suit Gundam, Quatre Raberba Winner of Gundam Wing, Dearka Elsman of Gundam SEED, Auel Neider of Gundam SEED Destiny and Setsuna F. Seiei of Gundam 00. In video games, he voices Jin Kazama in Street Fighter X Tekken.

Biography
Swaile attended Sir Winston Churchill Secondary School in Vancouver.  He graduated from Kwantlen University with a degree in Graphic and Visual Design.

Swaile has acted in several animated series. One of his earliest anime roles was in the English dub of Ranma ½ where he voiced Mousse. When the Ocean Group dubbed Dragonball Z in the mid 1990s, Swaile voiced Adult Gohan. He also voiced Nightcrawler in X-Men: Evolution and voiced Ace in My Little Pony Tales. In the late 2000s, he voiced the lead characters Rock in Black Lagoon and Light Yagami in the hit anime Death Note. He has reprised his role for the latter's Death Note live action film dub.

Swaile is known for many roles in the Mobile Suit Gundam franchise. These roles include Amuro Ray of Mobile Suit Gundam, Quatre Raberba Winner of Gundam Wing, Dearka Elsman of Gundam SEED, Auel Neider of Gundam SEED Destiny and Setsuna F. Seiei of Gundam 00.

Filmography

Anime

Animation

Film

Film

Video games

References

External links
 

Living people
Canadian male video game actors
Canadian male voice actors
Kwantlen Polytechnic University alumni
Male actors from Vancouver
20th-century Canadian male actors
21st-century Canadian male actors
Year of birth missing (living people)